The Spring River is a short but significant tributary of the North Umpqua River in Douglas County in the U.S. state of Oregon. Evidence suggests that nearby Thirsty Creek has an underground connection to the Spring River and that underground connections from other sources exist.

Hydrology
The underground water feeding the springs emerges along the contact between glacial deposits and ash-flow deposits that form the bedrock. Although Spring River and other nearby spring-fed streams are short, their total water contribution to the North Umpqua is significant, especially during dry months.

Thirsty Creek is a perennial stream that flows on the surface upstream of Spring River but sinks underground about  before reaching it. Even so, it appears likely to researchers that it is part of the same watershed and contributes to the Spring River flow. Evidence also suggests that below-surface connections from elsewhere feed into Spring River.

Fish
Spring River is a spawning ground for kokanee from Lemolo Lake and brown trout from the lake and the river. The river has good spawning gravels, a stable flow, and desirable temperatures for fish.

See also
 List of rivers of Oregon

References

External links
Umpqua Watershed Council

Rivers of Oregon
Rivers of Douglas County, Oregon
Umpqua National Forest